William Henry Stanton (6 October 1790 – 24 March 1870) was a British Liberal Party politician.

Parliamentary career
At the 1841 general election, Stanton was elected as one of the two Members of Parliament (MPs) for the parliamentary borough of Stroud in Gloucestershire. He was returned to the House of Commons again in 1847, but did not seek re-election at the 1852 general election.

His son, Alfred John Stanton, was also MP for Stroud, from 1874 to 1880.

References

External links 
 

1790 births
1870 deaths
Liberal Party (UK) MPs for English constituencies
UK MPs 1841–1847
UK MPs 1847–1852
People from Stroud